The Woman in the Septic Tank  is a 2011 Filipino comedy film directed by Marlon Rivera, written by Chris Martinez, and starring JM De Guzman, Kean Cipriano, Cai Cortez and Eugene Domingo. The film follows three aspiring filmmakers who set out to make a film for the sole purpose of receiving international recognition and awards.

The Woman in the Septic Tank was submitted as the Philippines' official entry for the 2011 Academy Awards for Best Foreign Film, and was an entry for the 2011 Cinemalaya Festival. It was produced by Martinez-Rivera Films and Quantum Films. The film was released on August 3, 2011, by Star Cinema and grossed 38.4 million pesos and was the highest grossing Filipino independent film at the time until it was surpassed in 2015 by That Thing Called Tadhana.

Overview

Chris Martinez wrote the screenplay for the film. Martinez and Rivera submitted the film for the "New Breed, Full Length Film" category for the 7th Cinemalaya Independent Film Festival. The festival was held from July 15 to the 24th at the Cultural Center of the Philippines.

After the mass critical success of the movie at the film festival, Star Cinema purchased the rights to release the film for a wider release. The film was released on August 3, 2011, to over 50 theaters nationwide and grossed almost 40 million pesos becoming the highest grossing Philippine independent film at the time.

Synopsis
Jocelyn, Rainier, and Bingbong are three film school graduates who are dead-set on making an Oscar-worthy film. They set out to do a quick pre-production as a courtesy call to their lead actress played by Eugene Domingo, and a thorough inspection of their film's major location, the Payatas dumpsite. They believe they have a winning script, and the energy and drive to make their dreams come true, no matter what the cost. There, they use Eugene Domingo's acting skills to her limit, including forcing her to swim in a sewer, despite her pleas that she can do anything, except swim in a sewer.

Cast
Eugene Domingo plays a fictionalized version of herself, whom the filmmakers want to star in their movie Walang Wala (With Nothing)
Domingo also portrays Mila, the protagonist of With Nothing.
JM De Guzman as Bingbong, the producer of With Nothing, who is focused on adjusting the film to help them gain recognition from festivals and win awards.
Kean Cipriano as Rainier de la Cuesta, the director of With Nothing.
Cai Cortez as Jocelyn, the mostly silent production manager of Bingbong who visualizes several scenarios of With Nothing presented by Rainier and Bingbong.

Cherry Pie Picache and Mercedes Cabral appear in cameo appearances as themselves, who are the other options of Bingbong, Rainier and Jocelyn in casting the part of Mila.

Antoinette Jadaone Bilang babae sa catering.

Reception

Box office
The film broke box office records for the Cinemelaya Independent Film Festival. It is the first full-length film to have its audience tickets sell to its maximum capacity within ten days of showing at the festival. The film was a commercial as well as critical success. The film earned a total of P20 million on its first five days. The total gross of the film amounted to P38.4 million, making it the highest grossing independent film in the history of Philippine cinema until it was surpassed in 2015 by That Thing Called Tadhana.

International
Richard Kuipers of Variety describes The Woman in the Septic Tank as "a lively laffer."  He also praises the performance of lead actors Cipriano and de Guzman, calling it "spot-on as the guys with one eye on the slums and the other on travel and trophies."  Meanwhile, Maggie Lee of The Hollywood Reporter says the film is "a lambast of the pretensions of independent cinema in his country and his fellow filmmakers' inflated egos."  However, she is concerned about its "specialized topic and low-budget look" that may be off-putting for some audience, which may minimize its commercial prospect internationally.  She also compares how the film replays specific sequences, each with narrative or stylistic revisions, to "a Groundhog Day of pilot filmmaking."

The film is an official entry for the 2011 Vancouver International Film Festival, Pusan International Film Festival, the Hawaii International Film Festival, the Tokyo International Film Festival, and the Far East Film Festival. The film was chosen by the Film Academy of the Philippines to represent the Philippines in the Best Foreign Language Film category of the 84th Academy Awards, but it did not make the final shortlist.

Awards and nominations

|-
|rowspan="5"|2011
|rowspan="5"| 7th Cinemalaya Independent Film Festival*
|Best Screenplay (Chris Martinez)
|
|-
|Audience Choice Awards 
|
|-
|Best Performance of an Actress (Eugene Domingo)
|
|-
|Best Director (Marlon N. Rivera)
|
|-
|Best Picture
|
|-
|rowspan="17"|2012
|rowspan="2"| 6th Asian Film Awards<ref>[http://www.pep.ph/news/32662/pep-exclusive-eugene-domingo-remains-optimistic-despite-ang-babae-sa-septic-tank39s-failure-to-make-the-oscar-cut-cries-over-her-asian-film-awards-nomination/1/2 PEP EXCLUSIVE: Eugene Domingo remains optimistic despite Ang Babae Sa Septic Tank's failure to make the Oscar cut; cries over her Asian Film Awards nomination]</ref>
|Best Screenwriter (Chris Martinez)
|
|-
|People's Choice Awards - Favorite Actress (Eugene Domingo)
|
|-
| Federal Ministry for Economic Cooperation and Development (BMZ), Germany
| Cinema Fairbindet award
|
|-
|rowspan="4"| 10th Gawad TANGLAW for Films
|Best Director (Marlon Rivera)
|
|-
|Best Screenplay (Chris Martinez)
|
|-
|Best Actress (Eugene Domingo)
|
|-
|Best Film
|
|- 
|rowspan="10"| 28th PMPC Star Awards for Movies
| Digital Movie of the Year
|
|-
| Digital Movie Director of the Year (Marlon Rivera)
|
|-
|Movie Actress of the Year (Eugene Domingo)
|
|-
|Digital Movie Original Screenplay of the Year (Chris Martinez)
|
|-
|Digital Movie Cinematographer of the Year (Larry Manda)
|
|-
|Digital Movie Editor of the Year (Ike Veneracion)
|
|-
|Digital Movie Production of the Year (Norma Regalado)
|
|-
|Digital Movie Musical Scorer of the Year (Vincent de Jesus)
|
|-
|Digital Movie Sound Engineer of the Year (Albert Michael Idioma & Addiss Tabong)
|
|-
|Digital Movie Theme Song of the Year ("Sabaw")
|
|}

Sequel

Following the success of the film, a sequel, The Woman in the Septic Tank 2: Forever is Not Enough'', was released on December 25, 2016, as an official entry to the 2016 Metro Manila Film Festival. Rivera and Martinez return as director and writer, respectively, as well as Domingo, Cipriano and Cortez reprising their roles.

References

External links
Ang Babae Sa Septic Tank on Cinemalaya.com
 
Ang Babae Sa Septic Tank Official Website

2011 films
2010s Tagalog-language films
Star Cinema films
Philippine New Wave
2011 comedy films
Films directed by Marlon N. Rivera